Kevon Keston Cooper (born 2 February 1989) is a former cricketer from Trinidad and Tobago. He played for Trinidad and Tobago and Leeward Islands as well as for Rajasthan Royals in the IPL and in various other Twenty20 leagues around the world.

Early life
Cooper comes from a footballing family. One of his brothers, Kevin Molino, plays for Minnesota United in Major League Soccer. He grew up playing football as well but was persuaded by his father, a cricket fan, to switch his allegiance. When Cooper was picked for the T&T Under-19 squad, he left football behind.

Cricket career
In January 2011, cricket officials raised concerns over Cooper's bowling action, and he went to the University of Western Australia to undergo tests and undertake remedial work to correct the fault in his bowling action. In August 2011, Cooper was cleared to play.

He returned and participated in the Champions League in 2011. Mixing speeds with his medium pacers to good effect, he took five wickets in six games while conceding just 5.29 runs an over. Coming in at No. 7, he posted a strike rate of 191.17 at an average of 21.66. It was these attributes that drew the attention of the Royals, who bought him for $50,000 in the IPL player auction.

During Rajasthan Royals' first game against Kings XI Punjab, he hit his first ball for a six and followed it up with a four. With the ball in hand, he claimed 4 wickets. Against Kolkata Knight Riders, he took 3 more wickets.

References

External links

1989 births
Living people
Trinidad and Tobago cricketers
Trinbago Knight Riders cricketers
Rajasthan Royals cricketers
Chattogram Challengers cricketers
Uthura Rudras cricketers
Fortune Barishal cricketers
Lahore Qalandars cricketers
Khulna Tigers cricketers
Leeward Islands cricketers
Dhaka Dominators cricketers